Camilo Carreón (August 6, 1937 – September 2, 1987) was an American professional baseball player. His son Mark was also a major league player.

Playing career

White Sox
Signed by the White Sox in 1956, Carreón rose steadily through their farm system, hitting over .300 at three different levels, including .311 in the Triple-A American Association, with 165 hits and 91 runs batted in, in 1959. He was named the Association's All-Star catcher. Carreón made his major league debut on September 27, 1959, the closing day of Chicago's pennant-winning season. He hit a fly ball out against Pete Burnside of the Detroit Tigers in his only at bat. He was late reporting to Sarasota, Florida, for spring training in 1960 because of service in the U.S. Army, then spent the bulk of the  campaign back in Triple-A, this time with San Diego of the Pacific Coast League, and hit .279 in 109 games. He then received his second consecutive September call-up, batting .235 in eight games, including seven starts as catcher.

He hit a two-run single off Whitey Ford to give Juan Pizarro a 2–1 victory over the New York Yankees on August 15, 1961. The second-inning hit enabled the White Sox to break Ford's 14-game winning streak. Overall, he hit .271 in his first full MLB season. The next year, he supplanted Lollar as the White Sox' regular catcher, starting 85 games and hitting .256. It was his last full and healthy season in the majors.

Indians and Orioles
The White Sox placed Carreón on the disabled list on July 3, 1964, after he tore tendons in his right arm. During the 1964–65 offseason, he was part of a blockbuster three-way trade with the Cleveland Indians and Kansas City Athletics that also included Rocky Colavito, Tommy John and Tommie Agee. Going into the  campaign, Carreón was listed as the Indians' second-string catcher, behind Joe Azcue. But he played only 19 games with the Tribe, spent 45 games back in Triple-A with the Portland Beavers of the Pacific Coast League, and was one of five players assigned outright to Portland in October 1965. 

Cleveland then traded Carreón to the Orioles during spring training of 1966 in a one-for-one deal for Lou Piniella, then a 22-year-old, minor league outfielder in the Baltimore organization. The Orioles were en route to their first-ever American League pennant that season, but Carreón got into only four games for Baltimore (his last on June 8, when he hit a double in his final MLB at bat), and spent the latter half of the year with Triple-A Rochester. He played two more minor league seasons before retiring from baseball.

As a major leaguer, Carreón collected 260 hits, including 43 doubles, four triples, and 11 home runs, with 114 runs batted in. He batted .264 lifetime. Defensively, he recorded a .993 fielding percentage as a catcher, committing only 13 errors in 1,776 total chances. He died in Tucson, Arizona, at the age of 50, and is buried in the Hermosa Memorial Cemetery in Colton.

See also

 List of second-generation Major League Baseball players
 Chicago White Sox all-time roster

References

External links
, or Retrosheet, or SABR Biography Project

1937 births
1987 deaths
American baseball players of Mexican descent
Baltimore Orioles players
Baseball players from California
Chicago White Sox players
Cleveland Indians players
Colorado Springs Sky Sox (WL) players
Duluth-Superior White Sox players
Holdrege White Sox players
Indianapolis Indians players
Jacksonville Suns players
Major League Baseball catchers
People from Colton, California
Portland Beavers players
Rapiños de Occidente players
Rochester Red Wings players
San Diego Padres (minor league) players
Tucson Toros players
American expatriate baseball players in Colombia
American expatriate baseball players in Venezuela